Rashtravadi Communist Party (Nationalist Communist Party), a political party in Uttar Pradesh, India. RCP was floated by social worker Kaushal Kishore. Kishore had been expelled from Communist Party of India in 2001. He had and contested assembly elections twice for CPI.

In the 2002 assembly elections Kishore won in the Malihabad seat. Kishore got 62 571 votes (47.37%). Kishore as a stable backing from the Pasi community.

RCP and Kishore fights for the conditions and rights of hijras. RCP has nominated hijras in elections. In the 2002 Uttar Pradesh assembly elections Payal Kinner (registered as a female candidate) contested the Lucknow West seat. Payal got 1680 votes (1,34%).

Kishore has been inducted as a minister of state in Mulayalam Singh Yadav's cabinet in Uttar Pradesh. RCP has however developed closer relations to Indian National Congress.

Kishore stood as a candidate in Mohanlalganj in the Lok Sabha elections in 2004 obtaining 28 757 votes (5,03%).

RCP participates in the Confederation of Indian Communists and Democratic Socialists.

Political parties established in 2001
Political parties in Uttar Pradesh
Communist parties in India
Communist Party of India breakaway groups
2001 establishments in Uttar Pradesh